Atilio Esteban Cattáneo (October 15, 1889 - June 22, 1957) was an Argentine soldier and politician, a pioneer of aviation in his country and who served as a national deputy in opposition to Peronism.

Biography

Education and early career
Cattáneo was born October 15, 1889, in Lobos, Argentina and graduated from Argentina's officers' college in 1910 as a Communications Engineer. Shortly after graduated as a military aviator. He was a pilot for Brazilian availtion pioneer Alberto Santos-Dumont during his 1916 visit to Argentina. After joining the Army General Staff, he joined Argentina's Military Geographic Institute (Instituto Geográfico Nacional).

Political activism
He identified with the Radical Civic Union at the start of Hipólito Yrigoyen's second presidency in 1928 and took part of the army's reorganization. Cattáneo tried to defend Yrigoyen during the 1930 Argentine coup d'état which lead to him being discarged from the military when José Félix Uriburu came to power.

In December of the following year, Lieutenant Colonel Gregorio Pomar organized a revolution attempt. This was followed by a secord attempt to recover democracy in 1932 led by Cattáneo and Major Regino Lascano spurred on by election fraud and the banning of some political activity. The plans were discovered two days before they were expected to start, leading to the arrest of Cattáneo, deposed president Yrigoyen, and others. Most of the political leaders were shortly released but Cattáneo was given a long prison sentence. During this period, Cattáneo authored two books which were released in 1935 and 1939. In 1937 he was part of the Argentine League for the Rights of Man, which sought constitutional legality.

When the 1943 Argentine coup d'état broke out, Cattáneo asked to be reinstated into the army with simultaneous retirement. Initially, he aligned with the new dictatorship which he identified as being responsible for ending the Infamous Decade. Refusing to abandon radicalism and being opposed to Juan Perón he was elected to the Argentine Chamber of Deputies in 1946 as part of the Block of 44 radicals. At the end of 1949, Cattáneo accused Perón of lying about his assets, offering to buy the president's house for the falue that was declared. In response, Cattáneo was expelled from the Chamber of Deputies and was stripped of his military status.

Retirement
Following his expulsion from the Chamber of Deputies, Cattáneo retired from political activity and devoted himself to literature and playwriting. He died in Buenos Aires on June 22, 1957. Several schools and streets in Argentina are named for him.

References

Cattáneo
Cattáneo
Cattáneo
Cattáneo